Cabana was a chocolate bar produced by Rowntree's, combining coconut, caramel, cherries inside a milk chocolate outer layer.

It was first produced in the 1980s It was discontinued in the early 1990s.

The television ad used a version of the song Day-O (The Banana Boat Song) (as sung by Harry Belafonte), with the words "Come mister magic man, make me a Cabana", and the strap line was "tropical magic". According to the Daily Mirror, "The dodgy ethnic stereotyping in the advert may have angered Ofcom had it been made today".

References

Rowntree's brands
Food brands of the United Kingdom
Defunct brands
British confectionery
Chocolate bars